Potpourri is a mixture of dried, naturally fragrant plant material.

Potpourri or Pot-Pourri may also refer to:

 Pot-Pourri (group), an Australian opera/musical theatre group
 Potpourri (music), a kind of musical form structured as ABCDEF...
 Potpourri, a 1980 album by Ray Bryant
 Potpourri (The Thad Jones/Mel Lewis Orchestra album), 1974
 Potpourri (P-Model album), 1981
 The Potpourri, an American weekly newspaper in Houston, Texas

See also

 Popery, an archaic pejorative word for Roman Catholicism
 Akrobatisches Potpourri, an 1895 German silent film
 Pot-au-feu, a French beef stew
 Potpourrii, a 2008 video game